Superdrug Stores plc (trading as Superdrug) is a health and beauty retailer in the United Kingdom, and the second largest behind Boots UK. The company is owned by A.S. Watson (Health & Beauty UK) Ltd which is part of the A.S. Watson Group. It was acquired as part of the buyout of Kruidvat BV in October 2002. The A.S Watson Group is itself part of the Hong Kong conglomerate CK Hutchison Holdings.

Superdrug trades from nearly nine hundred shops across the United Kingdom and Ireland, and also serves Denmark, Finland and Sweden online. The company employs over 14,000. Besides offering health and beauty products online and in shops, there are pharmacies with consultation rooms in over 220 shops, and a further 19 contain nurse clinics. It maintains links with sister companies also owned by A.S. Watson Group: Savers and The Perfume Shop.

History

Origins and expansion

In 1964, Superdrug was incorporated under the name Leading Supermarkets Limited by the Goldstein brothers in London, both of whom had experience working in the groceries retail industry. Later that year the business adopted the present name. The first Superdrug shop opened in Putney, London on 26 April 1966.

By 1968, there were three shops trading in Putney, Croydon and Streatham. In the same year Superdrug acquired its first distribution centre, in Wimbledon. The chain grew rapidly, and expanded to a chain of forty shops by the beginning of the 1970s. In 1971, The Rite Aid Corporation, an American chemist chain, acquired 49% of the business.

By 1981, there were three hundred Superdrug shops in the United Kingdom, and they opened their 11,148 m² (120,000 ft²) distribution centre and office complex at Beddington Lane near Croydon, Superdrug’s head office is still based in Croydon having recently moved to a more central location. This centre closed in July 2007, and the southern distribution operation moved to Dunstable, with the head office moving to new offices in central Croydon in 2017. The northern distribution operates from South Elmsall, Pontefract, West Yorkshire.

In 1983, the business was floated on London's Unlisted Securities Market.

In March 1987, Superdrug was sold to Woolworth Holdings (now known as Kingfisher plc) for £57 million. The sale allowed accelerated growth of the brand through utilisation of Kingfisher's surplus high street property portfolio and substantial financial assets.

In January 1988, Superdrug acquired Tip-Top, a discount chemist chain which had a large presence in the north of England and Scotland, and Share Drug Stores plc, a southern-based chain. These acquisitions and an aggressive expansion programme saw the chain grow to six hundred outlets throughout the United Kingdom.

Superdrug continued to grow over the next eight years, increasing profitability and market share. In 1995, the company began a rebranding programme, which saw it leave behind its discount heritage and move upmarket, with a new corporate identity – under the banner "the real beauty is the price" – and new larger shops in prime retail locations.

Superdrug decided to relocate their head office in 2017, having spent more than 40 years at Beddington Lane. The company relocated to a more central location in Croydon having declared their love for the town, securing their future in the town, with a bigger and modern head office to develop the future of the business.

Acquisition
Facing increasing pressure from supermarkets and new discount chains, in July 2001, Superdrug was sold to Kruidvat, a chemist operator from continental Europe, to allow Kingfisher to focus on its DIY and electrical chains. Kruidvat was subsequently sold to A.S. Watson, the retail and manufacturing business of the Hong Kong conglomerate CK Hutchison Holdings, formally Hutchison Whampoa, in November 2002.

A.S. Watson is also the parent company of Savers, the United Kingdom's number three chemist chain. Subsequently, several of Superdrug's smaller shops were converted into Savers, and approximately three hundred Savers shops were converted into branches of Superdrug. In April 2006, Superdrug entered the Republic of Ireland, and began rolling out its "next generation" shops, the first of which opened in Uxbridge. Since arriving in Ireland the brand is now also represented in Douglas Isle of Man and St Helier Jersey.

In December 2007, Superdrug withdrew a women's punch bag following complaints from anti domestic violence campaigners. The man-shaped product encouraged women to insert a photo of a male in the punch bag's face and had an arrow pointing at the groin stating "kick him here".

The ManKind Initiative, a domestic violence charity, said it was disgraceful that a national retailer like Superdrug should be openly selling products encouraging domestic violence against men. Following the complaints, the retailer withdrew the product and promised to donate any profits from sales of the item to the charity.

These focused on cosmetics and fragrance above all else and used plasma screens throughout the shop. Superdrug announced their intention to create 150 more next generation shops in 2008.

Since 2010
In February 2010, Superdrug became a BUAV approved retailer, joining several other high street chains in pledging its own brand products will be free from animal testing. All Superdrug own label products carry the leaping bunny cruelty free logo. This does not, however, cover products made by other brands that are sold in the shop.

During 2010, Superdrug went into partnership with sister company The Perfume Shop by trialling shop-in-shop concessions. The partnership was tried in eleven shops of Superdrug, including; Aylesbury, Milton Keynes, Bury, Glasgow, Westfield London and Kensington High Street. In January 2018, Superdrug were recognised by the Institute of Customer Service, placing fourth in the United Kingdom for Customer Satisfaction (UKCSI), with Yorkshire Bank in third, First Direct second, and Amazon first.

In September 2015, Superdrug announced the launch of a new app for customers to track their Superdrug Loyalty Points. This app eventually became the Superdrug Shopping App, which allows customers to order retail items from Superdrug branches online.

On 22 March 2018, Superdrug opened their first vegan only pop-up shop at Shoreditch’s Boxpark. Superdrug said it was in response to increased demand for plant based and cruelty free beauty products. The shop showcases Superdrug's own brand beauty and cosmetic products, and also exclusive branded products that are friendly to vegans.

In August 2018, Superdrug was the subject of a blackmail attempt using data obtained from its website via credential stuffing.

Superdrug lost a court case in December 2019 resulting from words in an email issued by the company's buyer, "Please go ahead with the below", referring to supplier Athena Brand's proposals to supply a minimum quantity of Nature's Alchemist products. The words were interpreted as creating a contract between the two parties, and by inference appeared to mean that the buyer had authority to enter into such a contract.

In April 2020, it was announced that Superdrug was rolling out a new Pharmacy app to its stores across the UK, in partnership with Healthera. The app allows Superdrug patients to order prescriptions and book services online.

Since 2021, the company sponsors the UK-wide medicine packet recycling programme under which used medicine blister packets can be handed in at 195 Superdrug branches (those with in-store pharmacies), for processing by TerraCycle.

Products
In February 2012, Superdrug went into partnership with Pro Skin Clinics, which enabled Superdrug to offer specialist skincare clinics in their shops. Treatments on offer range from laser hair removal to facials. Superdrug planned to have fifty clinics by the end of 2013, starting with shops on Kensington High Street and Oxford Street, and then concentrating on recently refurbished shops.

In February 2013, Superdrug ventured into the premium skincare market, by launching a new and exclusive brand called “B”. The brand is cruelty free and vegan. It offers both skincare and make up, and was launched during January to February 2013, accompanied by a multimillion-pound advertising campaign including television advertising, magazine promotion, blogger reviews and a pop up tour around the United Kingdom's largest shopping centres.

It became the first high street retailer in the United Kingdom to offer chickenpox vaccination in 58 of its shops, at a cost of £65 per dose, two doses being required, in July 2017.

Superdrug Mobile
Superdrug Mobile is a mobile virtual network operator launched on 20 June 2018 which operates in the United Kingdom using Superdrug's sister company Three's network and is exclusive to members of Superdrug's "Health & Beautycard" loyalty scheme.

Marketing

Advertising
On 1 October 2010, the campaign Take Another Look was launched by Superdrug to encourage customers to "Take Another Look" at the company.

On 7 February 2013, Superdrug launched a new marketing and advertising campaign, "That Superdrug Feeling", featuring staff from their shops.

Dare Magazine
Superdrug's Dare Magazine underwent a major makeover, to bring it in line with the company's "Take Another Look" campaign. The Magazine is distributed in-shop and on the streets of London for free. On 10 February 2011, Superdrug announced that the magazine would be the first customer magazine to use digital watermarking technology. Readers will be able to use their smartphone to view interactive video content, and access exclusive news and tips by scanning digital watermarks embedded in the magazine.

Loyalty card
On 11 May 2011, Superdrug launched their first reward card called The Beautycard. The card was launched as part of the Take Another Look campaign, which has been at the heart of the company's marketing strategy since October 2010. On 27 May 2011, Superdrug announced they had signed up one million customers to the scheme.

In 2015, Superdrug adapted their loyalty card in order to appeal to more of a mass market, renaming it Health and Beautycard. The concept of the card containing a mirror remained but it was redesigned to give a more mature look and feel. The card can be used   physically or digitally via the Superdrug mobile app, available on AppStore and Google play.

Podcast
On 2 June 2019, Superdrug released an eight-episode podcast titled 'The Beauty of it All'. KVH Studios worked together with the Superdrug Social and Marketing team, alongside content marketing agency, The River Group, to create and launch an eight episode series of podcasts, hosted by television and radio presenter Vick Hope, and featuring celebrity guests and industry experts. The podcast took a backstage look at the beauty industry and the issues facing it, covering topics such as how veganism is transforming the beauty world, the latest trends in skincare, and the influence of drag culture and makeup on the high street.

References

External links
 
 

Retail companies established in 1964
Companies formerly listed on the Alternative Investment Market
CK Hutchison Holdings
Pharmacies of the United Kingdom
Pharmacy brands
1971 mergers and acquisitions
1987 mergers and acquisitions